Yelena Motalova (born 28 January 1971) is a long-distance runner from Russia, who specializes mainly in the 3000 metres steeplechase. She is a former world record holder in this obstacle race, clocking 9:48.88 on 31 July 1999 in Tula. She was the Russian national champion in the steeplechase in 1999. She competed at the 1998 IAAF World Road Relay Championships for Russia and led off her team to sixth place. She won the Murtenlauf in 1999 and the Annecy Half Marathon in 2001.

International competitions

National titles
Russian Athletics Championships
3000 m steeplechase: 1999

References

External links 

1971 births
Living people
Russian female long-distance runners
Russian female steeplechase runners
Russian female cross country runners
Russian Athletics Championships winners
World record setters in athletics (track and field)
20th-century Russian women
21st-century Russian women